Mustafa Sarıgül (born 15 November 1956) is a Turkish writer, entrepreneur and politician. He is currently the leader of Party for Change in Turkey. He was the mayor of the Şişli district in Istanbul between 1999 and 2014. He is recently embroiled in a legal battle with the current mayor of Şişli who accused Sarıgül for threatening the life of his family.

Biography 
Mustafa Sarıgül comes from Eastern Anatolia Region, where he grew up and visited the local school. As a young boy he herded sheep. In 1962 his family moved to Istanbul, where he saw his father, who worked as a bouncer and warehouse worker, for the first time. He studied at Marmara University professorship. He started his professional career directing İstanbul Elektrik Tramvay ve Tünel, a local transport company.

Political career 
In the parliamentary elections in 1987, he was elected as a member of the Social Democratic Populist Party (Turkish: Sosyaldemokrat Halkçı Parti, SHP) with a record vote in the city of Istanbul as the youngest Member of Parliament of Turkey.

Between 1999 and 2002 Sarıgül was a member of the Democratic Left Party (Turkish: Demokratik Sol Parti, DSP) under Prime Minister Bülent Ecevit. On 19 April 1999, he was overwhelmingly elected mayor of Şişli, as the successor of Cuneyt Akgun. In 2002, he joined the Yeni Türkiye Partisi (New Turkey Party) of Foreign Minister İsmail Cem İpekçi, before he became a member of the Republican People's Party (Turkish: Cumhuriyet Halk Partisi, CHP) in 2003. Within the CHP Sarıgül was an internal party rival of chairman Deniz Baykal. Due to that background he later was expelled from the party in 2005. He was involved in a fistfight with some of the delegates during the 2005 General Assembly of 
CHP that tarnished his potentials to get involved with national politics of Turkey. After a period as an independent, he announced in 2008 to become again a member of the Democratic Left Party.

He unsuccessfully ran for mayor of the metropolitan municipality of Istanbul from the Republican People's Party in the local elections of 2014.

In the local elections of 2019 he ran for mayor of Şişli for the DSP and reached the 2nd place.

On 21 December 2020 He founded Party of Change in Turkey

Personal life 

Mustafa Sarıgül first wife Gülsüm Köksaloğlu died early. He has divorced from his second wife Aylin Kotil in 2008 and has two children. 
 He is the author of two books; TBMM'de Bir Milletvekili and İstanbul'da Direksiyon Sallamak.

Corruption Charges
Sarıgül was elected into the Turkish Parliament in 1987 as the youngest MP and as member of SHP. Another MP from SHP, Tevfik Koçak, made a request to investigate corruption and bribery charges related to the procurement of military aircraft. Claims are made later by Tevfik Koçak, that Sarıgül made another request to the parliament falsifying Koçak's signature to withdraw the claim about the corruption charges. Sarıgül was dismissed from SHP in 1992.

Cumhuriyet Halk Partisi prepared a report in 2005 with details of bribery and corruption claims in the Şişli municipality. He was dismissed from the CHP in 2005.

Can Ataklı, a columnist applying to CHP, running for mayorship in İstanbul in 2013, questioned Sarıgül's connections with Soros and Gulen Movement, requesting Sarıgül to publicize the financial support he receives from businessmen.

Publications 
Mustafa Sarıgül is author of two books; 
 TBMM'de Bir Milletvekili
 İstanbul'da Direksiyon Sallamak

See also
 Kemal Kılıçdaroğlu
 Deniz Baykal
 Mansur Yavaş
 Republican People's Party
 Şişli

References

1956 births
Living people
People from İliç
Contemporary Republican People's Party (Turkey) politicians
Democratic Left Party (Turkey) politicians
Movement for Change in Turkey politicians